Davidson "Dave" Eden (born 26 March 1988) is a Ghanaian footballer who plays as a centre back for Oberliga Hamburg club Hamm United. Until 2015, his surname was Drobo-Ampem.

Career 
Eden played in the youth for SC Hamm 02 and signed in 2005 for SC Vorwärts/Wacker 04. In the 2006–07 season he moved to the youth side of FC St. Pauli.

Eden made his debut on the professional league level in the 2. Bundesliga for FC St. Pauli on 13 February 2009 when he came on as a substitute in the 24th minute in a game against Rot-Weiß Oberhausen. He started in the next game against 1. FC Kaiserslautern.

On 31 January 2011, he went on loan to Esbjerg fB until the end of the season. After returning to Hamburg in summer he did not play in any league matches and on 31 August 2011 he joined Esbjerg again on another loan deal. On 2 July 2012, he signed a two-year deal with Esbjerg.

Two years later, on 1 September 2014 he moved to Austrian Football First League club FC Wacker Innsbruck. On 29 August 2015, he signed a one-year contract with FC St. Pauli.

Eden signed with Danish 1st Division-club Hobro IK on 2 September 2016, but didn't get his contract extended, so he left the club on 1 January 2017.

Personal life
In October 2015, it was announced that Eden had acquired German citizenship. On this occasion he also had his surname changed from "Drobo-Ampem" to "Eden", only stating to the public that it was for "personal reasons".

Honours
Esbjerg
Danish Cup: 2012–13

References

External links
 

1988 births
Living people
German sportspeople of Ghanaian descent
Footballers from Hamburg
Ghanaian footballers
German footballers
Association football defenders
FC St. Pauli II players
FC St. Pauli players
Esbjerg fB players
FC Wacker Innsbruck (2002) players
Hobro IK players
Lüneburger SK players
Lüneburger SK Hansa players
FC Teutonia Ottensen players
2. Bundesliga players
Regionalliga players
Bundesliga players
Danish Superliga players
Danish 1st Division players
2. Liga (Austria) players
Oberliga (football) players
Ghanaian expatriate footballers
German expatriate footballers
Ghanaian expatriate sportspeople in Denmark
German expatriate sportspeople in Denmark
Expatriate men's footballers in Denmark
Ghanaian expatriate sportspeople in Austria
German expatriate sportspeople in Austria
Expatriate footballers in Austria
Footballers from Accra